Atrachelus is a genus of assassin bugs in the family Reduviidae, found in the Americas. There are at least two described species in Atrachelus.

Species
 Atrachelus cinereus (Fabricius, 1798)
 Atrachelus mucosus (Champion, 1899)

References

Further reading

 
 
 
 
 
 
 
 
 

Reduviidae